Steinbach am Donnersberg is a municipality in the Donnersbergkreis district, in Rhineland-Palatinate, Germany. The current mayor is Susanne Röß, elected in 2019.

References

Donnersbergkreis